In signal processing, a filter's frequency response comprises regions of frequency called passbands, stopbands, and transition regions.  Typically there is one of each, but there may be multiples.  A transition region (or transition band) is the interval between a passband and a stopband, where the curve of amplitude vs frequency continuously changes between a high level and a low level.

See also 
 Transition Band

References

Filter frequency response